Jutta Langenau ( Großmann, 10 October 1933 – 9 July 1982) was a German swimmer who won a gold medal at the 1954 European Aquatics Championships, setting the first official world record in the 100 m butterfly at 1:16.6 minutes. She also competed at the 1956 Summer Olympics in same event and finished sixth.

From 1949 to 1959, she won 15 East German titles: 100 m backstroke in 1949, 100 m freestyle in 1951, 400 m freestyle in 1950, '51, '52, 1954, '55, '56, 1958 (silver in 1957, bronze in 1959), 1500 m freestyle in 1958 and 1959 (not organised before 1958), 100 butterfly in 1955, '56, 1958 and 1959.

In 1954 she was the first sportswoman elected into the Volkskammer (People's Chamber), the parliament of former GDR, representing the Free German Youth (FDJ).

Towards the end of her swimming career and after retiring from competitive swimming, from 1956 to 1978, she worked as an instructor at a sports school. After the birth of her third child she was a sports teacher in a polytechnic high school in Erfurt. Among her students was the Olympic swimmer Roland Matthes.

References

1933 births
1982 deaths
German female swimmers
Female butterfly swimmers
Swimmers at the 1956 Summer Olympics
Olympic swimmers of the United Team of Germany
Sportspeople from Erfurt
European Aquatics Championships medalists in swimming
20th-century German women